Flight 267 may refer to:

Linjeflyg Flight 267, crashed on 20 November 1964
Trigana Air Flight 267, crashed on 16 August 2015

0267